Ata-Jurt Kyrgyzstan is a Kyrgyz political party running in the 2021 parliamentary election. The party is not affiliated with the Ata-Zhurt party, and is linked with President Japarov and the Mekenchil party.

The party was legally founded in 1999.

References

Political parties in Kyrgyzstan
Political parties established in 2021